Jaime Trobo (5 October 1956 – 24 July 2019) was an Uruguayan politician who served as a Deputy and as Minister of Sports and Youth pertaining to the National Party.

Biography 
He began military in White Youth in 1975, in opposition to the dictatorship. In 1982 he was elected conventional in the Herrerist sector along with who years later would become President of the Republic, Luis Alberto Lacalle.

In 1984 he was elected departmental mayor for Montevideo, a position he held between 1985 and 1989 when he was elected National Deputy for Montevideo on the list of Héctor Martín Sturla. He was reelected deputy in the elections of 1994, 1999, 2004, 2009 and 2014. In 1998 he chaired the Chamber of Deputies.

Between 2000 and 2002 he served as Minister of Sports and Youth in the government of Jorge Batlle.

In 2008 he chaired the International Affairs Committee of the House of Representatives.

He married Ana María Bidegain and they had three daughters.

Trobo suffered from cancer and in his last years he had traveled to Spain to get treatments for this disease. His last public appearance was on June 30, 2019, at the headquarters of Luis Lacalle Pou, on the occasion of the internal elections of 2019. He died on 24 July 2019 from a cancer.

References 

1956 births
2019 deaths
People from Canelones, Uruguay
National Party (Uruguay) politicians
Government ministers of Uruguay
Presidents of the Chamber of Representatives of Uruguay